Bush is a hamlet in the parish of Bude-Stratton, Cornwall, England, UK (where the 2011 census population is included).

References

Hamlets in Cornwall